Papa, Mama, the Maid and I is a French comedy film from 1954, directed by Jean-Paul Le Chanois, written by Marcel Aymé, starring Robert Lamoureux and Louis de Funès.

Cast 
 Robert Lamoureux : Robert Langlois, the son, future lawyer
 Gaby Morlay : Gabrielle Langlois, mother
 Fernand Ledoux : Fernand Langlois, father
 Nicole Courcel : Catherine Liseray, future spouse of Robert
 Madeleine Barbulée : Marie-Louise
 Louis de Funès : Mr Calomel, the neighbouring handy man
 Yolande Laffon : Madeleine Sautopin, friend of Mum
 Robert Rollis : Léon « alibi », campaign of Robert
 Sophie Sel : Mss Leconte, a pupil
 Dominique Davray : the butcher
 Françoise Hornez : Nicole, a neighbour
 Judith Magre : German, an employee of the office of mister Turpin
 Hubert Deschamps : the spectator who did not have dinner
 Léon Arvel : parent
 Claude Castaing

See also 
 Papa, maman, ma femme et moi - sequel

References

External links 
 
 Papa, maman, la bonne et moi... (1954) at the Films de France

1954 films
French comedy films
1950s French-language films
French black-and-white films
Films directed by Jean-Paul Le Chanois
Films with screenplays by Marcel Aymé
1954 comedy films
1950s French films